Glauchau station is the main station of Glauchau in southwest of the German state of Saxony on the Dresden–Werdau line. Glauchau also has another station at Glauchau-Schönbörnchen.

History 

On 15 November 1858, the Chemnitz-Zwickau section of the Dresden–Werdau line was opened together with Glauchau station. The line was built the support of the Saxon government and eventually became part of the Royal Saxon State Railways. The station originally had seven 680 m-long station tracks with a total of 35 sets of points. With the opening of the Glauchau–Wurzen railway to Wurzen on 10 May 1875, the station was slightly expanded.

From 1908, planning began on expansion of the station, which was no longer big enough for to handle traffic demands. In 1913, actual construction work started, however, it was interrupted by the First World War and could not resume until 1923. The new works included new freight facilities, four signal boxes, a maintenance depot and two bridges over the Lungwitzbach stream. The tracks and platforms were altered and expanded. On 30 April 1926, the new Glauchau station went into operation.

During the Second World War bombs were dropped on the station area on several occasions. On 11 April 1945, 55 people, including 54 members of the Wehrmacht died in a carriage.

During the 2002 European floods the Glauchau–Wurzen railway was damaged. As a result, the last passenger train ran on the line on 13 August 2002. Freight traffic had already been terminated on 1 July 2000.

Regional services

Glauchau is served by the following services:

Notes

External links 
 www.dampflok-glauchau.de
 www.sachsenschiene.de

Railway stations in Saxony
Railway stations in Germany opened in 1858
Buildings and structures in Zwickau (district)